Hardev Singh Kular (13 December 1930 – 31 December 2013) was a Kenyan field hockey player. He competed in the men's tournament at the 1956 Summer Olympics.

References

External links
 

1930 births
2013 deaths
Kenyan male field hockey players
Olympic field hockey players of Kenya
Field hockey players at the 1956 Summer Olympics
People from Nakuru
Kenyan people of Indian descent
Kenyan people of Punjabi descent